Honduras competed at the 2016 Summer Olympics in Rio de Janeiro, Brazil, from 5 to 21 August 2016. This was the nation's eleventh appearance at the Summer Olympics.

Honduran Olympic Committee sent the nation's second-largest delegation to the Games, matching its roster size with Beijing 2008. A total of 26 athletes, 25 men and 1 woman, were selected to the Honduran team across eight sports, with the men's football squad returning for its third consecutive appearance at these Games. Among the Honduran athletes were weightlifter Cristopher Pavón, butterfly swimmer Allan Gutiérrez, taekwondo fighter Miguel Ferrera, and track sprinter Rolando Palacios, who led the squad as the nation's flag bearer in the opening ceremony.

Honduras narrowly missed out on its first ever Olympic medal in Rio de Janeiro, as the men's football team, led by captain Bryan Acosta, suffered a 2–3 defeat to the Nigerians for the bronze.

Athletics

Honduras received a universality slot from IAAF to send a male athlete to the Olympics.:

Track & road events

Boxing

Honduras entered one boxer to compete only in the men's lightweight division into the Olympic boxing tournament. Teofimo Lopéz had claimed his Olympic spot with a semifinal victory at the 2016 American Qualification Tournament in Buenos Aires, Argentina.

Football

Men's tournament

Honduras men's football team qualified for the Olympics by attaining a top two finish at the 2015 CONCACAF Men's Olympic Qualifying Championship in the United States.

Team roster

Group play

Quarterfinal

Semifinal

Bronze medal match

Judo

Honduras qualified one judoka for the men's heavyweight category (+100 kg) at the Games. Cuban-born Ramón Pileta earned a continental quota spot from the Pan American region as Honduras' top-ranked judoka outside of direct qualifying position in the IJF World Ranking List of May 30, 2016.

Swimming

Honduras received a Universality invitation from FINA to send two swimmers (one male and one female) to the Olympics.

Taekwondo

Honduras received an invitation from the Tripartite Commission to send Beijing 2008 Olympian Miguel Ferrera in the men's welterweight category (80 kg) into the Olympic taekwondo competition.

Weightlifting

Honduras received an invitation from the Tripartite Commission to send London 2012 Olympian Cristopher Pavón in the men's middle-heavyweight category (94 kg) to the Olympics.

See also
Honduras at the 2015 Pan American Games

References

External links 

 

Nations at the 2016 Summer Olympics
2016
2016 in Honduran sport